Gavin Ramon Smellie (born June 26, 1986) is a Jamaican-born Canadian sprinter.

Born in Saint Andrew Parish, Jamaica, Smellie moved to Etobicoke in Canada at the age of 14.  Smellie is a graduate of Western Kentucky University which he attended on an athletic scholarship. He represented the Western Kentucky Hilltoppers in collegiate track and field competitions. He participated in the 2012 Summer Olympics in the 4 × 100 m relay with teammates Jared Connaughton, Oluseyi Smith and Justyn Warner. In the final, the Canadian relay team arrived in third place and initially believed they had won bronze but they were disqualified when officials judged that Connaughton had stepped on the lane line just before passing the baton. The relay team from Trinidad and Tobago were awarded the bronze. Smellie was selected to represent Canada at the 2018 Commonwealth Games. In 2021, he competed in the Men's 100 metres of the 2020 Summer Olympics and was eliminated in the quarterfinals.

He competed at the 2020 Summer Olympics.

Personal bests

References

External links
 
 
 
 
 
 

1986 births
Living people
Canadian male sprinters
Olympic track and field athletes of Canada
Athletes (track and field) at the 2012 Summer Olympics
Athletes (track and field) at the 2020 Summer Olympics
Canadian people of Jamaican descent
Athletes (track and field) at the 2014 Commonwealth Games
Athletes (track and field) at the 2018 Commonwealth Games
Commonwealth Games competitors for Canada
Athletes (track and field) at the 2015 Pan American Games
Athletes (track and field) at the 2019 Pan American Games
Pan American Games track and field athletes for Canada
World Athletics Championships athletes for Canada
Western Kentucky Hilltoppers and Lady Toppers athletes